Greek National Road 77 is a national highway on the island of Euboea, Greece. It connects Chalcis with Aidipsos via Agia Anna and Istiaia.

77
Roads in Central Greece
Euboea